Cycloneuralia is a clade of ecdysozoan animals including the Scalidophora (Kinorhynchans, Loriciferans, Priapulids) and the Nematoida (nematodes, Nematomorphs).  It may be paraphyletic, or may be a sister group to Panarthropoda.  Or perhaps Panarthropoda is paraphyletic with respect to Cycloneuralia. The group has also been considered a single phylum, sometimes given the old name Nemathelminthes. The uniting character is the nervous system organization with a circumpharyngeal brain and somata–neuropil–somata pattern.

The name derives from the position of the brain around the pharynx.

References 

Ecdysozoa taxa
Protostome unranked clades